Jubilee Games is an international sporting event in which Ismailis from around the world participate. Jubilee games started as Golden Jubilee Games, as commemoration of 50 years of Immamat of Aga Khan IV. The first event of Jubilee games was held in 2008, in Nairobi, Kenya.

History 
Jubilee games started as a part of Golden Jubilee celebration of Aga Khan IV. Jubilee games started as Golden Jubilee games but continued as Jubilee Games. The first event held in Nairobi, Kenya in 2008. Jubilee games are meant to promote competitive sport and fitness among Ismaili Jamaat. Jubilee games will held every four years from now onwards.

Jubilee Games 2008 
Jubilee games of 2008 were held in Kenya. Jubilee Games 2008 attracted 1200 Ismaili athletes from 28 countries.

Jubilee Games 2016 
Jubilee Games of 2016 held in Dubai, UAE, from 22 to 29 July 2017. Jubilee games 2016 was bigger and a larger event, that attracted 2200 athletes and around 1500 volunteers. A total of 16 games, including individual and team sports were part of Jubilee games.

Event 
The opening ceremony was attended by Shaikh Nahyan bin Mubarak Al Nahyan, the Minister of Culture and Knowledge Development. The event included a concert by Salim-Sulaiman.

Results

References 

Multi-sport events
Ismailis